Kamalbhan Singh Marabi is an Indian politician and a member of parliament to the 16th Lok Sabha from Sarguja (Lok Sabha constituency), Chhattisgarh. He won the 2014 Indian general election being a Bharatiya Janata Party candidate.

References

India MPs 2014–2019
Living people
People from Surguja district
Lok Sabha members from Chhattisgarh
Bharatiya Janata Party politicians from Chhattisgarh
1963 births